Basreh may refer to:
 Basreh, Hormozgan
 Basreh, West Azerbaijan